The Lorton Reformatory, also known as the Lorton Correctional Complex, is a former prison complex in Lorton, Virginia, established in 1910 for the District of Columbia, United States.

The complex began as a prison farm called the Occoquan Workhouse for non-violent offenders serving short sentences.  The District established an adjacent reformatory in 1914, and then a  walled penitentiary constructed by inmates from 1931 through 1938, as a division of the reformatory with heightened security.  The complex came under the administration of the District of Columbia Department of Corrections when it was formed in 1946.

The final prisoners were transferred out in November 2001.

Lorton was also the site of a bunker used by the government from 1959 to 2001 that housed emergency communications equipment to be used in the event of a war with the Soviet Union.  Lorton Reformatory also hosted Nike missile site W-64.

History

Near the reformatory lies Revolutionary War patriot William Lindsay's circa 1790 estate known as Laurel Hill. This house served as a residence for the reformatory superintendent.

In 1908, President Theodore Roosevelt appointed a special Penal Commission to investigate deplorable conditions of the District of Columbia's jail and workhouse in Washington. As a result, the Commission recommended a complete change in the philosophy and treatment of prisoners in D.C. The United States Congress acted upon this recommendation, and a  tract north of the Occoquan River was purchased in 1910 through condemnation proceedings.

District architect Snowden Ashford drew plans for the workhouse in 1910, while Leon E. Dessez was the special architect appointed by the commissioners to draft plans for the new workhouse. It opened in 1916 as a facility for less serious offenders in the Lorton Correctional Complex, with classically inspired, symmetrical dormitory complexes.

From 1911 the complex had its own railroad, the Lorton and Occoquan Railroad that operated until 1977.

From June to November 1917, a number of nationally prominent suffragists were arrested from their "Silent Sentinels" pickets of the White House at the White House, and held at the Occoquan Workhouse.   Approximately 168 women, most from the National Women's Party, experienced mistreatment at the workhouse.  Some were force-fed after they began hunger strikes. The night of November 14, 1917, is known as the "Night of Terror" because of how badly the suffragist prisoners were tortured, beaten, and abused.  Portrayals of events at the Occoquan Workhouse played a key part in the 2004 film Iron Jawed Angels, a film about the history of the National Woman's Party, Alice Paul, Lucy Burns, and other members of the 1910s Women's Voting Rights Movement.

The penitentiary buildings of the 1930s were constructed by the prisoners themselves, using brick manufactured at the on-site kiln complex from Occoquan River clay. Initially only the maximum security section was fenced, but fences were established for other sections in the 1970s due to area politicians calling for the closing of the prison and increased concerns over prison escapes.

The Youth Center, housing 18-22 year old prisoners, opened in 1960 and was established due to the post-World War II era anti-juvenile delinquency law Federal Youth Corrections Act of 1950. It was located next to the Fairfax County Landfill and in proximity to the prison's dairy farm. The initial concept was that the young prisoners could acquire a trade and/or get an education and then have their records expunged. Initially the prisoners carried books entitled "So We All Understand" and wore suits and ties. The building was designed to resemble a campus of a university, and it used open plan dormitories. At some point older adult felons began to be housed alongside the younger prisoners. Eddie Dean of the Washington City Paper stated that the center became "a sort of parody of its original inception". According to Dean, at one time it was the "murder capital" of Lorton, but by 1997 the Youth Center became "a relatively calm and safe compound, especially compared with the Quack."

It became known in its later years, however, as an outdated and badly overcrowded facility. The last prisoners were removed from Lorton Reformatory late in 2001. As a result of the National Capital Revitalization and Self-Government Improvement Act of 1997, felons from the District of Columbia began going to Federal Bureau of Prisons facilities.

On July 15, 2002, the property was sold to Fairfax County.  The transfer was enabled by the Lorton Technical Corrections Act passed by Congress in October 1998. It required the county to develop a plan to maximize use of land for open space, parkland or recreation prior to the transfer.  The site has been part of the D.C. Workhouse and Reformatory Historic District since February 16, 2006.

Cultural Arts Center 

In 2002, The Lorton Arts Foundation sought to reuse the property of the former prison. The idea was to reconstruct and repair the prison facility and transform it into a Cultural Arts Center, to be known as the Workhouse Arts Center. Of course, much had to be altered to serve in such a capacity. In 2004, approval from The Fairfax County Board of Supervisors allowed the project to get under way. Soon after the decision was made to repurpose the land and old historic buildings, restoration began. Walls were repaired, rooms were completely cleared, and the tall fences around the property were taken down.

In 2008, the Arts Center was ready to be used by the public after four years to build and restore six separate buildings, transforming them into headquarters for hobbies and activities of all types. Ceramics, photography, painting, theatre, film and much more is now offered and accessible by the public within the center. Classes are offered in most or all of the categories offered. 
The Arts Center also houses famous pieces of art by local and renown artists. Well-known artists have visited the center to teach and to present their work. With over 800 different art classes offered, this has become a popular destination for the aspiring artist.

Along with the Workhouse Arts Center, the former prison yard has now become home to baseball and soccer fields. With much ground still available, plans are in place to add more athletic fields.  Many attend a yearly walk through the old grounds, and stages have been set up to host local theater organizations.  Walk-throughs and tours were offered before the restoration began in 2004 to view rooms such as the cafeteria, Warden's office, shower room, and cell dorms.  Guard towers still surround the grounds.

Lucy Burns Museum 
A museum in honor of suffragist Lucy Burns from the National Woman's Party opened in 2020. The Museum hosts celebrations for Women's Equality Day each year in August.

Notable prisoners

Chuck Brown, musician, 1950s
Lucy Burns, suffragist and women's rights advocate, 1917
Iris Calderhead, suffragist and women's rights advocate, 1917
Petey Greene, television and radio talk-show host, 1960s
Alison Turnbull Hopkins, suffragist and women's rights activist, 1917
Laura Houghtaling Ingalls, aviator and Nazi agent, 1943
Paula O. Jakobi, suffragist and women's rights activist, 1917
Dora Lewis, suffragist and women's rights activist, 1917
George Gordon Liddy, FBI agent, lawyer, talk show host, actor, and burglar, 1973–1977
Norman Mailer, novelist, journalist, essayist, playwright, film-maker, actor, and liberal political activist; included in his book Armies of the Night; briefly, in 1967?
Anne Henrietta Martin, suffragist and women's rights activist, 1917
Alice Paul, suffragist and women's rights activist, 1917
Elizabeth Selden Rogers, suffragist and education advocate, 1917
Doris Stevens, suffragist, author, and women's rights activist, 1917
Betty Gram Swing, suffragist and women's rights activist, 1917
Amelia Himes Walker, suffragist and women's rights activist, 1917
Ruza Wenclawska, suffragist, factory inspector, trade union organizer, actress, and poet, 1914

See also
 Crime in Washington, D.C.

References

Further reading
 "H.R. 461, Closing of Lorton Correctional Complex" (Archive).
 Hayden, Jonathan (fourth-year student at Howard University) and Arvilla Payne-Jackson (Howard University Professor of Anthropology and Linguistics). "Excerpts from "Graffiti as a Sense of Place" Lorton Prison, Virginia" (Archive). Reflections. April 21, 2004. p. 117-122.

Defunct prisons in Virginia
Buildings and structures in Fairfax County, Virginia
History of the District of Columbia
Parks in Fairfax County, Virginia
Government buildings on the National Register of Historic Places in Virginia
Historic districts on the National Register of Historic Places in Virginia
National Register of Historic Places in Fairfax County, Virginia
Prisons on the National Register of Historic Places
NOVA Parks
Georgian Revival architecture in Virginia
1910 establishments in Virginia